Schaich is a river of Baden-Württemberg, Germany. It flows into the Aich near Neuenhaus.

Geography

Course 
The Schaich springs at about 544 m from the Hengstbrunnen in the forest south of Altdorf a little east of the Gabeleiche at the Rauhen Hau.

From there the river Schaich flows in mainly eastern direction through or at the edge of the areas of the municipalities Altdorf, Holzgerlingen, Weil im Schönbuch, Dettenhausen, Walddorfhäslach, Aichtal and Schlaitdorf. At the end of the district Neuenhaus of Aichtal it flows at an elevation of 315.9315.9 m southwest into Aich.

At the end of its 23.6 km long path with an average bottom gradient of 9.7 ‰ it flows about 228 meters altitude below its source.

The river Schaich flows in mainly eastern direction through the natural area Schönbuch, a mountainous forest area of the south German Keuperberglandes. It has its source at the northern edge of the southern Schönbuch, then moves along the southern edge of the Holzgerlinger Platte, the lower course crosses the northern Schönbuch.

At the beginning it runs approximately at the northern edge of the nature area Naturpark Schönbuch and later through its north-eastern part.

Catchment area 
The Schaich drains an area of 38.1 km², which lies entirely within the Schönbuch natural area. Further east, in the south, the catchment area of the Reichenbach, which flows into the Neckar at Pliezhausen, is bordered by the Reichenbach, then on this side by the continuously shorter Neckar tributaries.

On the northern side, from the mouth upwards only beyond Betzenberg only short tributaries compete with the Aich which takes the Schaich, in the area of the upper course then its partly very near tributary Seitenbach which also runs about east. Finally, north of the immediate source area of the Schaich, only about one kilometre away, the Altdorfer Würm, a branch of the Würm, which drains via the Nagold and the Enz only much further down than the Aich into the Neckar. The watershed, which is less prominent on this section than towards the south, is therefore hydrologically the most important.

Tributaries 
Direct tributaries from the source to the estuary. Selection.Stated lengths and catchment areas according to the official water map.

 Kreuzwiesenbach, from right near the domain Schaichhof of Holzgerlingen, 2,0 km and 1,8 km²
 Ramsbach, from right between Weil im Schönbuch and Dettenhausen, 2,4 km and 2,5 km²
 Fronlach, from the right in Dettenhausen, 2.9 km and 3.8 km²
 Weinhaldengraben, from left in Dettenhausen
 Sauwasengraben, from right to Dettenhausen
 (stream from the Hummelklinge), from the left, 0,8 km

See also 
List of rivers of Baden-Württemberg

References

Rivers of Baden-Württemberg
Schönbuch
Rivers of Germany